The term national army typically means the lawful army of the state as distinct from rebel armies or private armies that may operate there.

National Army may also refer to:
National Revolutionary Army, the national army of the Republic of China in 1925–1947, known has the National Army after 1928
Korean Liberation Army, the national army of the Republic of Korea in 1941–1946, known has the National Army after 1943
National Army (USA), the 1917 army of the United States of America
National Army (Ireland) (1921–1924), the army of the Irish Free State in its formative years
Suriname National Army, the name of the Surinamese military since 1980
National Army,, Nationalist rebel forces in the Spanish Civil War
Syrian National Army, Syrian opposition group
National Army of Colombia, the land military force of the government of Colombia and the largest service of the Colombian Armed Forces
National Army of Guatemala,, a branch of the military of Guatemala
National Army of Uruguay,, a branch of the military of Uruguay
National Army of Venezuela, one of the four professional branches of the Armed Forces of Venezuela
National Army, a playable faction in the Electronic Arts computer game Battlefield Heroes
Libyan National Army, military forces of the Libyan House of Representatives

See also 
 National Liberation Army (disambiguation)
 National Salvation Army (disambiguation)
 Nationalist army (disambiguation)
 國軍 (disambiguation)